Claudia Ferri is a Canadian actress. She is most noted for her performance as Anna Barberini in the film Mambo Italiano, for which she was a Jutra Award nominee for Best Supporting Actress at the 6th Jutra Awards in 2004, and her starring role as Elena Battista in the television sitcom Ciao Bella.

Career 
Ferri has also appeared in the films Hard Core Logo, The Assignment, Running Home, Dead Awake, 3 Seasons (3 saisons), Through the Mist (Dédé à travers les brumes), Heat Wave (Les Grandes chaleurs), A Date with Miss Fortune, The Sticky Side of Baklava (La Face cachée du baklava) and Brain Freeze, and the television series Omertà, Naked Josh, Durham County, The Killing, Rogue, 19-2, Unité 9 and Bad Blood.

Filmography

Film

Television

References

External links

20th-century Canadian actresses
21st-century Canadian actresses
Canadian film actresses
Canadian television actresses
Canadian stage actresses
Canadian people of Italian descent
Actresses from Montreal
Living people
Year of birth missing (living people)